SS Charles H. Marshall was a Liberty ship built in the United States during World War II. She was named after Charles H. Marshall, an American businessman, art collector and philanthropist who was prominent in society during the Gilded Age.

Construction 
Charles H. Marshall was contracted on 22 April 1943 by the United States Maritime Commission (MARCOM) with J.A. Jones Construction Company, Panama City, Florida as MARCOM Hull 2329. She was laid down on 11 October 1944, sponsored by Mrs. Clarence Graham, the wife of the assistant work manager of outfitting at JAJCC, launched on 17 November 1944 and delivered ten days later.

History
On delivery on 27 November 1944, Polarus Steamship Co., Inc., New York, were appointed managers of Charles H. Marshall by the War Shipping Administration and she was registered with Official Number 246833 and home port of New York. On 9 April 1947 she was sold to Polarus Steamship and by 1950 renamed Polarus Pioneer.

After a series of sales and name changes she was returned to the Maritime Administration (MARAD) on 23 December 1963, under an exchange program, and placed in the James River Reserve Fleet, in Lee Hall, Virginia. 
She was sold for scrapping, 22 February 1972, to Eckhardt and Co., for $62,222. She was withdrawn from the fleet, 27 March 1972.

References

Bibliography 

 
 
 
 
 
 
 

 

Liberty ships
Ships built in Panama City, Florida
1944 ships
James River Reserve Fleet